The 1944 Alameda Coast Guard Sea Lions football team was an American football team that represented the United States Coast Guard's Alamadea Coast Guard station during the 1944 college football season. The team compiled a 4–2–2 record. Lieutenant Joe Verducci was the coach.

Schedule

References

Alameda Coast Guard
Alameda Coast Guard Sea Lions football seasons
Alameda Coast Guard Sea Lions football